Boeill Creek is a locality in New South Wales, Australia, located approximately 15 km north of Mildura, Victoria.

References

Towns in New South Wales
Wentworth Shire